Hollywood, City of Dreams (Spanish:Hollywood, ciudad de ensueno) is a 1931 American drama film directed by George Crone and starring José Bohr, Lia Torá and Donald Reed. It was a Spanish-language film made in the United States, as part of an effort to reach Spanish-speaking audiences around the world following the introduction of sound. Unlike some other Spanish-language films of the era, it was not a remake of an English film but an original story.

A young immigrant hopes to make it big in Hollywood and meet his idol, a female film star. He goes through a number of minor jobs but eventually gets his break and begins a romance with his heroine. Nonetheless the film ends on a downbeat note as he returns on a boat to his native country.

Cast
 José Bohr as José  
 Lia Torá as Helen Gordon  
 Donald Reed as Actor  
 Nancy Drexel as Alice  
 Enrique Acosta as Film Director  
 Elena Landeros 
 César Vanoni
 Nicanor Molinare 
 Julia Bejarano 
 Mirra Rayo
 Luis Díaz Flores   
 Samuel Pedraza 
 Lloyd Ingraham

References

Bibliography
 Jarvinen, Lisa. The Rise of Spanish-language Filmmaking: Out from Hollywood's Shadow, 1929-1939. Rutger's University Press, 2012.

External links
 

1931 films
1931 drama films
1930s Spanish-language films
Spanish-language American films
American drama films
Universal Pictures films
Films about Hollywood, Los Angeles
American black-and-white films
1930s American films